Epsilon Eta Phi was a Professional Sorority in the field of business administration and commerce.  It was founded in 1927 and merged with Phi Chi Theta in 1973.

History
Epsilon Eta Phi was founded on May 3, 1927 at Northwestern University. It was incorporated on October 14, 1930 in the state of Illinois. It merged with Phi Chi Theta, a professional fraternity in business administration and economics on July 27, 1973.

The founders were Melba Pinckney Allen, Iona Bloomer Radsch, Florence Cockerham Turzak, Ruth Erickson Funk, Ruth Novak Berger and Evelyn Scheer Carlson.

It became a member of Professional Panhellenic Association on or before 1953,  and was still a member of PPA in 1968.

Epsilon had five active chapters and two inactive chapters by 1967.  Of the active chapters, it maintained two chapters at Duquesne University, one serving daytime students and the other, evening students.

One new chapter at Duquesne emerged from the two Epsilon Eta Phi predecessors that same year. The groups at Northwestern combined, but it is unclear where the other dormant and active chapters were absorbed.

Insignia
The official Insignia for Epsilon Eta Phi
 flower: rose-colored sweet pea
 colors: steel gray and old rose
 motto: To be rather than to seem
 publication: the Epsilon Eta Phi Magazine, is issued annually on Founders' Day.

Chapters
Chapters of Epsilon Eta Phi.  Active chapters at the time of merger noted in bold, inactive chapters noted in italics.

See also
 Alpha Kappa Psi , professional
 Delta Sigma Pi , professional
 Phi Gamma Nu , professional, originally women's
 Phi Chi Theta , professional, originally women's

 Beta Gamma Sigma , honor, (AACSB schools)
 Delta Mu Delta , honor, (ACBSP)
 Pi Omega Pi , honor, business education teachers
 Sigma Beta Delta , honor, (non-AACSB schools)

 Alpha Beta Gamma , honor, (2-yr schools)
 Kappa Beta Delta , honor, (2-yr schools, (ACBSP)

 Professional Fraternity Association

References

Defunct fraternities and sororities
Former members of Professional Fraternity Association